The 2013–14 Albanian Women's National Championship was the 5th season of women's league football under the Albanian Football Association.

The League was won by KF Vllaznia, its first title. By winning, KF Vllaznia qualified to 2014–15 UEFA Women's Champions League.

Teams

League table

References

External links
Kampionati Federata Shqiptare E Futbollit 
Albanian Women's Football Championship 2013/14 UEFA.com

 

Albania
Women's National Championship
Albanian Women's National Championship seasons